The Dent de Perroc is a mountain of the Swiss Pennine Alps, overlooking Arolla in the canton of Valais. With an elevation of 3,676 metres above sea level, the Dent de Perroc is one of the highest summit of the range separating the valley of Arolla on the west side from the valley of the Mont Miné Glacier on the east side.

See also
List of mountains of Switzerland

References

External links

Dent de Perroc on Hikr
Dent de Perroc on Summitpost

Mountains of the Alps
Alpine three-thousanders
Mountains of Valais
Mountains of Switzerland